Expert or Ekspert magazine (Russian: Журнал "Эксперт") is a Russian weekly business magazine, established in 1995 in Moscow by a group of editors and journalists who departed from Kommersant publishing house. It covers economics and finance, Russian business, international business, politics, science and technology, culture and arts. It also features a books and market indicators sections. It is part of Expert Group, a media, conference and research business based in Moscow. Besides Expert, it also includes Russkiy Reporter (a current affairs weekly) and Expert TV, a business-oriented TV channel.

Key facts
Languages: Russian, English (web-only; English website has not been updated since late 2008)
Pages: 80–160
Circulation: 90,000 copies (certain issues, containing special reports, up to 150,000 copies)
Readership: about 350,000
Ownership: group of editors (majority stake), Oleg Deripaska (minority stake), Globex bank (minority stake)
Editor: Valery Fadeyev (ru)

Specialised and regional publications
Expert Severo-Zapad, covering Northwestern region, headquarters in St. Petersburg - since 1999
Expert Ural, covering Urals region, headquarters in Yekaterinburg - since 2000
Expert Sibir’, covering Siberia and the Far East, headquarters in Novosibirsk - since 2003
Expert Kazakhstan, covering independent country of Kazakhstan, headquarters in Almaty - since 2003
Expert Volga, covering Volga valley region, headquarters in Samara - since 2005
D` (personal finance magazine) - since 2006
Expert Yug, covering South of Russia, headquarters in Rostov-on-Don - since 2007
Russkiy Reporter (Russian Reporter general news weekly) - since 2007
Expert Tatarstan, covering Russian republic Tatarstan, headquarters in Kazan - since 2014

Person of the Year
Since 2002 Expert has picked a Person of the Year - one or several individuals who significantly influenced economic, business, political or societal development in Russia. The Person of the Year is announced on the cover of the final issue each year. Since the first announcement, all Persons of the Year have been nationals of the Russian Federation. The nomination is similar to Person of the Year by the US Time magazine.

Business model
According to general director Valery Fadeyev, Russian aluminum magnate Oleg Deripaska has offered to set up a media holding named after the magazine "when Expert has grown to the need of developing a business".

References

External links
  

1995 establishments in Russia
Business magazines published in Russia
Magazines established in 1995
Magazines published in Moscow
Russian-language magazines
Weekly magazines published in Russia